Soft Focus with Jena Friedman is a series of TV specials created and hosted by Jena Friedman. The first special was aired on February 18, 2018, while the second on January 25, 2019. The specials are produced by Factual Productions, Inc. for air on Adult Swim.

In an interview on The Adult Swim Podcast with Matt Harrigan, Friedman announced that a third Soft Focus special was in the works.

Plot
Each Soft Focus with Jena Friedman special starts off with an investigative report segment focusing on a sensitive subject such as rape or online harassment, resulting in a social experiment that also functions as a prank. The second half of each special features an interview with a controversial real-life figure.

Episodes

Release
The first episode of Soft Focus premiered on Adult Swim's live video stream on February 16, 2018, was released for on demand streaming shortly after, and premiered on television on Sunday, February 18, 2018. The second special was released similarly, albeit over the course of the same day, with the live stream, on demand premiere, and television premiere all occurring on Friday, January 25, 2019.

References

Notes

External links
 

Adult Swim pilots and specials